Syrian Turkmen Brigades, also called the United Turkmen Army , are an informal armed opposition structure composed of Syrian Turkmen and Turks that form the military wing of the Syrian Turkmen Assembly, primarily fighting against the Syrian Armed Forces, Islamic State of Iraq and the Levant (ISIL) and the Syrian Democratic Forces. They are aligned with the Syrian opposition and are heavily supported by Turkey, which provides funding and military training along with artillery and aerial support. The groups represent a wide spectrum of ideologies from Islamism to secular Turkish nationalism.

History
In November 2015, Syrian Turkmen Brigades and al-Nusra Front fighters were engaged in heavy fighting against the Syrian government forces supported by the Shiite militias and the Russian Air Force. Turkmen forces have been the target of heavy Russian bombing in 2015, with reported civilian casualties which have been interpreted as a Russian effort aiming to change the ethnic dynamics of the region.

On 24 November 2015 a Russian Su-24 fighter was shot down by Turkish forces for allegedly violating Turkish airspace, near the Syrian border. The aircraft crashed on Syrian land. The two pilots ejected and were shot at in the air while using their parachutes by the Syrian Turkmen Brigades.

Military structure and groups

Aleppo
The Sultan Murad Division was formed in early 2013 and mainly operates in the Aleppo Governorate. Its groups includes: Mehmed the Conqueror Brigade, Sultan Murad Brigade, Martyr Zaki Turkmani Brigade, Ashbal Akida Brigade, Hamza and Abbas Brigade, Ahli Sunnah and Community Brigade, Yarmouk Regiment, 1st Regiment and the Turkmen Martyrs Brigade. Another predominantly Turkmen rebel militia in Aleppo Governorate is the Muntasir Billah Brigade.

Latakia
Formed in July 2015, the 2nd Coastal Division is the main Turkmen rebel group operating in the Latakia Governorate and is notable for killing one Russian Air Force pilot, who ejected from a Su-24 which was shot down by Turkey. The commander of the group, Alparslan Çelik, is a member of the Grey Wolves. The subdivisions are the Brigade of Mountain Turkmen, the Sultan Mehmet the Conqueror Brigade, the Sultan Selim Brigade, and the 1071 Raiders Brigade The 2nd Coastal Division has less than 500 fighters as of the end of 2015, although the group claims to have 2,000.

According to the Syrian Turkmen National Movement Party, as of early 2016, three out of more than 40 villages in the Turkmen Mountain of Latakia were left under Turkmen rebel control, as the result of the rebel defeat in the 2015–16 Latakia offensive. Many Turkmen rebels in the area are Turkish citizens affiliated with the Grey Wolves. The 2nd Coastal Division took part in the 2016 Latakia offensive in an attempt to regain the territory lost to government forces in 2015. Over the course of the offensive, rebels retook Kinsabba, though division commander Riyad Qarrah Bijeq was mortally wounded during the assault.

Aligned with SDF
The Seljuq Brigade (former Sultan Selim Brigade member, now Army of Revolutionaries member) and the Manbij Turkmen Battalion (Army of Revolutionaries's Northern Sun Battalion) are Syrian Turkmen groups operating Rojava Syria respectively, unlike other Syrian Turkmen rebel groups, they are allied with the Syrian Democratic Forces and are not supported by Turkey.

See also
 List of armed groups in the Syrian Civil War
 Syrian Turkmen

References

Bibliography

Anti-government factions of the Syrian civil war
Free Syrian Army
Syrian Turkmen organizations
Military units and formations established in 2012
2012 establishments in Syria
Syrian National Army
Turkish supported militant groups of the Syrian civil war